Hinkleville is an unincorporated community in Upshur County, West Virginia, United States.

The community was named after Abraham Hinkle, the proprietor of a local sawmill.

References 

Unincorporated communities in West Virginia
Unincorporated communities in Upshur County, West Virginia